Andrew Kim Taegon (21 August 1821 – 16 September 1846), also referred to as Andrew Kim in English, was the first Korean-born Catholic priest and is the patron saint of Korean clergy.

Life 
In the late 18th century, Catholicism began to take root slowly in Korea, having been introduced by scholars who visited China and brought back Western books translated into Chinese. In 1836 Korea saw its first consecrated missionaries (members of the Paris Foreign Missions Society) arrive, only to find out that the people there were already practicing Korean Catholics.

Born of Yangban, Kim's parents were converts and his father was subsequently martyred for practising Christianity, a prohibited activity in heavily Confucian Korea. After being baptized at age 15, Kim studied at a seminary in the Portuguese colony of Macau. He also spent time in study at Lolomboy, Bocaue, Bulacan, Philippines, where today he is also venerated. He was ordained a priest in Shanghai after nine years (1844) by the French bishop Jean Joseph Jean-Baptiste Ferréol. He then returned to Korea to preach and evangelize. During the Joseon Dynasty, Christianity was suppressed and many Christians were persecuted and executed. Catholics had to practise their faith covertly. Kim was one of several thousand Christians who were executed during this time. In 1846, at the age of 25, he was tortured and beheaded near Seoul on the Han River. His last words were:

Before Ferréol, the first bishop of Korea, died from exhaustion on 3 February 1853, he wanted to be buried beside Kim, stating, "You will never know how sad I was to lose this young native priest. I have loved him as a father loved his son; it is a consolation for me to think of his eternal happiness."

On 6 May 1984, Pope John Paul II canonized Kim along with 102 other Korean Martyrs, including Paul Chong Hasang, during his trip to Korea. The feast day of Andrew Kim Taegon, Paul Chong Hasang and companions is celebrated on 20 September.

See also
 Shrine of Saint Andrew Kim

References

Bibliography
"The Lives of the 103 Korean Martyr Saints (2): St. Kim Tae-gon Andrew," Catholic Bishops' Conference of Korea Newsletter No. 27 (Summer 1999).

External links

Andrew Kim Taegon, Paul Chong Hasang and Companions
Saint Kim Dae-gŏn

1821 births
1846 deaths
Expatriates in Macau
Korean expatriates in China
Korean Roman Catholic priests
Korean Roman Catholic saints
Martyred Roman Catholic priests
19th-century Roman Catholic martyrs
19th-century Christian saints
19th-century executions by Korea
Executed Korean people
People executed by Korea by decapitation
Christian martyrs executed by decapitation
People from Dangjin
Gimhae Kim clan
19th-century Roman Catholic priests
Joseon Christians